The 1990 Polish Speedway season was the 1990 season of motorcycle speedway in Poland.

Individual

Polish Individual Speedway Championship
The 1990 Individual Speedway Polish Championship final was held on 15 August at Lublin.

Golden Helmet
The 1990 Golden Golden Helmet organised by the Polish Motor Union (PZM) was the 1990 event for the league's leading riders. The final was held over six rounds.

Junior Championship
 winner - Tomasz Gollob

Silver Helmet
 winner - Tomasz Gollob

Bronze Helmet
 winner - Robert Kużdżał

Pairs

Polish Pairs Speedway Championship
The 1990 Polish Pairs Speedway Championship was the 1990 edition of the Polish Pairs Speedway Championship. The final was held on 13 September at Rzeszów.

Team

Team Speedway Polish Championship
The 1990 Team Speedway Polish Championship was the 1990 edition of the Team Polish Championship. 

Apator Toruń won the gold medal. The team included Wojciech Żabiałowicz, Jacek Krzyżaniak, Mirosław Kowalik and Robert Sawina.

First League

Second League

References

Poland Individual
Poland Team
Speedway
1990 in Polish speedway